The 2017–18 World Rugby Women's Sevens Series was the sixth edition of the global circuit for women's national rugby sevens teams, organised by World Rugby. There were five tournament events scheduled on the 2017–18 circuit and twelve teams competed in each tournament.

Format
Twelve teams compete at each event. The top-ranked teams at each tournament play off for a Cup, with gold, silver and bronze medals also awarded to the first three teams. Lower-ranked teams at each tournament play off for a Challenge Trophy. The overall winner of the series was  determined by points gained from the standings across all events in the season.

Teams
The "core teams" qualified to participate in all series events for the 2017–18 series were:

 
 
 
 
 

 
 
 
 
 

One additional core team qualified through winning the 2017 Hong Kong Women's Sevens:

Events
There were five tournaments in 2017–18:

Standings

Official standings for the 2017–18 series:

Source: World Rugby

{| class="wikitable" style="font-size:92%;"
|-
!colspan=2| Legend 
|-
|No colour
|Core team in 2017–18 and re-qualified as a core team for the 2018–19 World Rugby Women's Sevens Series
|-
|bgcolor=#fcc|Pink
|Relegated as the lowest placed core team at the end of the 2017–18 World Rugby Sevens Series
|-
|bgcolor=#ffc|Yellow
|Not a core team
|}

Placings summary
Tallies of top four tournament placings during the 2017–18 series, by team:

Tournaments

Dubai

Sydney

Kitakyushu

Langford

Paris

Players

Scoring leaders

Updated: 10 June 2018

Awards  

Updated: 10 June 2018

See also

 2017–18 World Rugby Sevens Series (for men)

References

 
2017
2018 rugby sevens competitions
2017 rugby sevens competitions
2018 in women's rugby union
2017 in women's rugby union